Eurhophaea is a monotypic snout moth genus described by Hans Georg Amsel in 1961. Its only species, Eurhophaea hyrcanella, is found in Iran.

Taxonomy
The species was described as a subspecies of Eurhodope flavella. It was later raised to specific rank.

References

Phycitinae
Monotypic moth genera
Moths of Asia
Taxa named by Hans Georg Amsel
Pyralidae genera